Shah Nil (also Romanized as Shāh Nīl; also known as Eslāmābād) is a village in Tus Rural District, in the Central District of Mashhad County, Razavi Khorasan Province, Iran. At the 2006 census, its population was 152, in 38 families.

References 

Populated places in Mashhad County